Professional Wealth Management (PWM) is a magazine about European wealth management. It is published by the Financial Times group.

PWM focuses on open and guided architecture and distribution of third party products by institutions across Europe. It also covers sub-advisory business matters.

It also has a dedicated online section called PWM Asia which focuses on the latest developments in the Asian wealth management industry.

PWM conducts the annual Global Private Banking Awards every November, with Citi Private Bank winning the overall award in 2012 and UBS Wealth Management winning the overall award in 2013.

References

External links
 PWM
 PWM Asia

Business magazines published in the United Kingdom
Monthly magazines published in the United Kingdom
Financial Times
Magazines established in 2001
Pearson plc
2001 establishments in the United Kingdom